Stenella is a genus of marine mammals in Delphinidae, the family informally known as the oceanic dolphins.

Species
Currently, five species are recognised in this genus:

The common name for species in this genus is the "spotted dolphins" or the "bridled dolphins".  They are found in temperate and tropical seas all around the world.  Individuals of several species begin their lives spotless and become steadily more covered in darker spots as they get older.

The genus name comes from the Greek stenos meaning narrow.  It was coined by John Gray in 1866 when he intended it as a subgenus of Steno.  Modern taxonomists recognise two genera.

The clymene dolphin (S. clymene) is the only confirmed case of hybrid speciation in marine mammals, descending from the spinner dolphin (S. longirostris) and the striped dolphin (S. coeruleoalba).

Stenella dolphins tend to be more active during nighttime and spend their daytime resting. Although these dolphins are supposed to spend 60% of their daytime resting, they happen to be exposed to human activities for 80% of their day. These patterns of sleep deprivation can have negative impact on their resting habit and leads to decline in their population size.

References

 
Oceanic dolphins
Cetacean genera
Taxa named by John Edward Gray